Cochinchinula is a genus of beetles in the family Buprestidae, containing the following species:

 Cochinchinula bilyi Volkovitsh, 2008
 Cochinchinula quadriareolata (Obenberger, 1924)
 Cochinchinula thailandica Volkovitsh, 2008

References

Buprestidae genera